Al-Krum, formerly Yazibagh, is a village in northern Aleppo Governorate, northwestern Syria.

The village administratively belongs to Nahiya Azaz in Azaz District. Nearby localities include Ma'arin at the opposite side of Mount Barsa,  to the south, and al-Salameh  to the southeast.

Demographics
In the 2004 census, Al-Krum had a population of 252.

The village has a mixed community of Turkmens, Arabs, and Kurds. In late 19th century, German traveler Martin Hartmann noted Yazibagh as a mixed Turkish and Kurdish village, then located in the Ottoman nahiyah of Azaz-i Turkman.

References

Populated places in Azaz District
Turkmen communities in Syria
Kurdish communities in Syria